The Japan Farmers Party (Nihon Nōmintō) was a political party in Japan.

History
The party was established by Katsutarō Kita and four independent members of the House of Representatives on 25 February 1947. Kita had previously formed the Japan Cooperative Party in August 1946. However, three of them, including Kita, were removed from the House of Representatives shortly afterwards as part of the post-war purge.

In the 1947 general elections the party won four seats, and a further four representatives joined the party after the elections. After talks about a merger with the National Cooperative Party failed due to the opposition of Nakano Shirō, the chairman of the party's central committee, the party considered renaming itself the New Farmers Party.

The 1949 general elections saw the party reduced to a single seat and it was disbanded thereafter, and effectively replaced by the New Farmers Party.

References

Defunct political parties in Japan
Political parties established in 1947
1947 establishments in Japan
Political parties disestablished in 1949
1949 disestablishments in Japan